Mbarek Bekkay (Arabic: مبارك البكاي; April 18, 1907 in Berkane, Morocco – April 12, 1961) was the 1st Prime Minister of Morocco between December 7, 1955 and April 15, 1958. Bekkay held the rank of colonel in the French army. He was the first Prime Ministers of Morocco since its independence from the French protectorate.

Early life 
Mbarek Bekkaï was born on April 18, 1907 in Berkane, in the northeast of Morocco. He belonged to the Berber Béni-Snassen tribe.

He attended the Military School of Dar El Beida, the present military academy of Meknes, from which he went out to lieutenant and joined the French army. He served excellently in World War II and rose to lieutenant colonel rank.

Career 
In 1939, in response to the Sultan's call, he went to France to participate in the World War II. At that time, he was wounded in the leg and subjected to captivity and subsequently transferred to Germany, and as a result of his severe injury to his leg, it was amputated.

In 1942, he became Caïd in Bni Drar. He was retired as 90% war invalid and was appointed captain in 1943. He became Pasha of Sefrou in 1944. He left active service in the French army in 1946 and was promoted to reserve lieutenant colonel in 1953.

He is one of the few pashas to have protested in 1953 against the deposition of Sultan Mohammed V, resigning from his post at Sefrou. He writes this telegram:

"Not approving the coup de force which provoked the deposition of HM the Sultan of Morocco, and which I consider illegal on all counts, I have decided to resign from my duties as Pasha of Sefrou in order to be faithful in my soul and conscience. I cannot, in fact, serve a regime which I hold to be illegal. »

He had the honor to sign the act of independence of Morocco on March 2, 1956 with Christian Pineau representing France, and April 7 with Martin Artajo representing Spain.

He resigned as Prime Minister during the May 1958 crisis, which was created by the refusal to allow the People's Movement Party.

Death 
Confronted with "recurrent health problems", he died in Rabat on April 12, 1961 - 45 days after King Mohammed V - and was buried in his hometown.

Awards 
 Croix de guerre des théâtres d'opérations extérieures
 Croix de Guerre 1939–1945
 Legion of Honour

References

External link

1907 births
1961 deaths
Moroccan Berber politicians
Moroccan colonels
People from Berkane
People from Sefrou
Prime Ministers of Morocco